The Patriotic Accord was a government and electoral coalition between Hugo Banzer's Nationalist Democratic Action and the Revolutionary Left Movement between 1989 and 1993. In the 1993 Bolivian general election the alliance got 21.1%.

References

1989 establishments in Bolivia
1993 disestablishments in Bolivia
Defunct political party alliances in Bolivia
Political parties disestablished in 1993
Political parties established in 1989